

This is a list of the National Register of Historic Places listings in Androscoggin County, Maine.

This is intended to be a complete list of the properties and districts on the National Register of Historic Places in Androscoggin County, Maine, United States. Latitude and longitude coordinates are provided for many National Register properties and districts; these locations may be seen together in a map.

There are 108 properties and districts listed on the National Register in the county, including 1 National Historic Landmark. Another 8 sites once listed on the Register have been removed.

Current listings

|}

Former and moved listings

|}

See also

 List of National Historic Landmarks in Maine
 National Register of Historic Places listings in Maine

References

 01
Androscoggin
Androscoggin County, Maine
Buildings and structures in Androscoggin County, Maine
Protected areas of Androscoggin County, Maine